The MLW World Tag Team Championship is a professional wrestling world tag team championship which is owned by the Major League Wrestling (MLW) promotion. The championship is generally contested in professional wrestling matches, in which participants usually execute scripted finishes rather than contend in direct competition.

The titles were unveiled on April 21, 2003, during the Underground TV tapings, under the MLW Global Tag Team Crown Championship name. The titles were vacated on February 10, 2004, after the promotion closed. After the relaunch of the promotion in 2018, Lucha Brothers (Penta el 0M and Rey Fénix) would win the vacant titles under the MLW World Tag Team Championship name on June 7, 2018.

History

Establishment and inactivity (2003–2004)
The titles were unveiled on April 21, 2003, during the Underground TV tapings, under the MLW Global Tag Team Crown Championship name. MLW would start a four-team single-elimination tournament to crown the first champions. The teams for the tournament were PJ Friedman and Steve Williams, Jimmy Yang and Mike Sanders, The Extreme Horsemen (C.W. Anderson and Simon Diamond) and Los Maximos (José Maximo and Joel Maximo). Friedman and Williams and The Extreme Hoursemen would both advance to the finals of the tournament. On May 9 at MLW Revolutions, The Extreme Hoursemen would defeat Friedman and Williams to become the first champions. However their reign would end on February 10, 2004, after the promotion stopped running events.

Inaugural Championship tournament (2004)

Revival (2018–Present)
After the promotion was revived the July 2017, MLW announced on May 10, 2018, the revival of the titles under the MLW World Tag Team Championship name, with Lucha Brothers (Penta el 0M and Rey Fénix), Team TBD (Jason Cade and Jimmy Yuta) and The Dirty Blondes (Leo Brien and Michael Patrick) facing each other in a three-way elimination match on June 7 to crown the new champions. On June 7, Lucha Brothers would defeat Team TBD and The Dirty Blondes in a three-way elimination match to win the vacant championships.

Three-way elimination championship match

Reigns
The inaugural champions were The Extreme Horsemen (C.W. Anderson and Simon Diamond). The Von Erichs (Marshall and Ross Von Erich) reign is the longest at 438 days, while 5150 (Danny Rivera and Slice Boogie) have the shortest reign at 112 days. L.A. Park is the oldest champion at 55 while MJF is the youngest at 23.

The current champions are  The Samoan SWAT Team (Juicy Finau and Lance Anoa'i), who are in their first reign, both as a team and individually. They defeated Hustle & Power (EJ Nduka and Calvin Tankman) on January 7, 2023 in Philadelphia, PA.

Names

References

External links 
 MLW World Tag Team Title History at Cagematch.net

Tag Team
World professional wrestling championships
Tag team wrestling championships